Yama is an album by American flugelhornist Art Farmer with saxophonist Joe Henderson featuring performances recorded in 1979 and originally released on the Japanese CTI label.

Reception 
The Allmusic review calls it "A decent but largely forgettable effort".

Track listing
 "Dulzura" (Clare Fischer) - 4:09   
 "Stop (Think Again)" (Barry Gibb, Robin Gibb, Maurice Gibb) - 6:48   
 "Young And Fine" (Joe Zawinul) - 6:43   
 "Lotus Blossom" (Don Grolnick) - 8:23   
 "Blue Montreux" (Mike Mainieri) - 6:58
Recorded at Power Station in New York City in April 1979

Personnel
Art Farmer - flugelhorn
Joe Henderson - tenor saxophone
Don Grolnick, Warren Bernhardt, Fred Hersch - keyboards
Mike Mainieri - synthesizer, vibraphone, arranger
David Spinozza, John Tropea - guitar
Eddie Gómez - bass
Will Lee - electric bass
Steve Gadd - drums 
Sammy Figueroa - percussion
Suzanne Ciani - synthesizer programming

References 

CTI Records albums
Art Farmer albums
Joe Henderson albums
1979 albums
Albums produced by Creed Taylor